Andrei Andreyevich Vavilchenkov (born 28 April 1990) is a former Russian professional football player.

Club career
He made his Russian Football National League debut for FC Ural Yekaterinburg on 24 May 2010 in a game against FC Volga Nizhny Novgorod. That was his only season in the FNL.

External links
 
 

1990 births
Sportspeople from Yekaterinburg
Living people
Russian footballers
Association football midfielders
FC Lokomotiv Moscow players
FC Ural Yekaterinburg players
Russian expatriate footballers
Expatriate footballers in Moldova